Masonville is a city in Delaware County, Iowa, United States. The population was 99 at the time of the 2020 census.  The city is located on the western border between Delaware and Buchanan counties.

History
Masonville was laid out in 1858. It was named for businessman R. B. Mason.

Geography
Masonville is located at  (42.479755, -91.590591).

Demographics

2010 census
As of the census of 2010, there were 127 people, 55 households, and 36 families living in the city. The racial makeup of the city was 96.9% White and 3.1% from two or more races. Hispanic or Latino of any race were 0.8% of the population.

There were 55 households, of which 25.5% had children under the age of 18 living with them, 52.7% were married couples living together, 9.1% had a female householder with no husband present, 3.6% had a male householder with no wife present, and 34.5% were non-families. 27.3% of all households were made up of individuals, and 3.6% had someone living alone who was 65 years of age or older. The average household size was 2.31 and the average family size was 2.83.

The median age in the city was 40.5 years. 24.4% of residents were under the age of 18; 4.7% were between the ages of 18 and 24; 26% were from 25 to 44; 32.3% were from 45 to 64; and 12.6% were 65 years of age or older. The gender makeup of the city was 46.5% male and 53.5% female.

2000 census
As of the census of 2000, there were 104 people, 49 households, and 32 families living in the city. The racial makeup of the city was 99.04% White, and 0.96% from two or more races. Hispanic or Latino of any race were 4.81% of the population.

There were 49 households, out of which 18.4% had children under the age of 18 living with them, 44.9% were married couples living together, 18.4% had a female householder with no husband present, and 32.7% were non-families. 26.5% of all households were made up of individuals, and 18.4% had someone living alone who was 65 years of age or older. The average household size was 2.12 and the average family size was 2.42.

In the city, the population was spread out, with 14.4% under the age of 18, 18.3% from 18 to 24, 26.0% from 25 to 44, 26.9% from 45 to 64, and 14.4% who were 65 years of age or older. The median age was 41 years. For every 100 females, there were 67.7 males. For every 100 females age 18 and over, there were 81.6 males.

The median income for a household in the city was $32,000, and the median income for a family was $40,625. Males had a median income of $30,313 versus $16,667 for females. The per capita income for the city was $20,166. There were 3.0% of families and 5.1% of the population living below the poverty line, including no under eighteens and 15.4% of those over 64.

Education
The West Delaware County Community School District operates local area public schools.

References

Cities in Iowa
Cities in Delaware County, Iowa
1858 establishments in Iowa
Populated places established in 1858